The Bolton Children's Book Award is an annual award given to works of children's literature published in paperback during the previous year. The award is sponsored by Bolton Literacy Trust, The University of Bolton and Page Nation.

List of prize winners

Shortlists

2011
My So Called Haunting by Tamsyn Murry
The Gates by John Connolly
Sparks by Ally Kennen
Fightback by Steve Voake
Crawlers by Sam Enthoven
The Double Life of Cassiel Roadnight by Jenny Valentine
2010
Lifegame by Alison Allen-Gray
Zelah Green, Queen of Clean by Vanessa Curtis
Bang, Bang, You're Dead! by Narinder Dhami
Mondays are Murder by Tanya Landman
The Pickle King by Rebecca Promitzer
The Soul Trade by E.E. Richardson
Forbidden Island by Malcolm Rose
Wolven by Di Toft
2009
A Beautiful Place for a Murder by Berlie Doherty 
Crash by JA Henderson
Ways to Live Forever by Sally Nicholls
The Eye of the Serpent by Philip Caveney
Zal and Zara and the Great Race of Azamed by Kit Downes
Young Samurai: The Way of the Warrior by Chris Bradford
Boy Thief by Zizou Corder
2008
Titanic 2020 by Colin Bateman
The Geek, The Greek and The Pimpernel by Will Gatti
The Cat Kin by Nick Green
The Black Book of Secrets by F.E. Higgins
Deeper than Blue by Jill Huckles
Skulduggery Pleasant by Derek Landy
Finding Violet Park by Jenny Valentine
Wild Magic by Cat Weatherill
2007
Jerry and the Jannans by Elly Brewer
The Howling Tower by Michael Coleman
Beast by Ally Kennen
Nemesis by Catherine MacPhail
Girl, Missing by Sophie McKenzie
Kiss of Death by Malcolm Rose
Flash Flood by Chris Ryan
The Shapeshifter: Finding the Fox by Ali Sparkes
2006
Invisible Friend by Louise Arnold
Worm in the Blood by Thomas Bloor
Indigo Blue by Cathy Cassidy
Jimmy Coates: Killer by Joe Craig
Sign of the Angel by Alan MacDonald
Vampirates: Demons of the Ocean by Justin Somper
Stuff by Jeremy Strong
2005
Millions by Frank Cottrell Boyce
Horace by Chris d'Lacey
Underworld by Catherine MacPhail
The Lost by Alex Shearer
Dizzy by Cathy Cassidy
The Defender by Alan Gibbons
CHERUB: The Recruit by Robert Muchamore
Avril Crump by Angela Woolfe

References

External links

Bolton Children's Book Award blog
Bolton Literacy Trust

British children's literary awards
Awards established in 2005
2005 establishments in the United Kingdom